Sugar Ray Leonard vs. Roberto Durán III, billed as Uno Mas, was a professional boxing match contested on December 7, 1989 for the WBC super middleweight title.

Background
Reigning WBC super middleweight champion "Sugar" Ray Leonard had made the first successful defense of his title after fighting Thomas Hearns to a draw. After the Hearns fight, Leonard began negotiations for both a third fight with rival Roberto Durán and a potential third fight with Hearns. Whilst a third Hearns fight never came into fruition, Leonard and Duran would reach an agreement to face one another and the fight was announced at a press conference on July 26, 1989, though the venue in which the fight would take place was still in question. Five days later, the then-yet-to-be-opened Mirage was announced as the venue for the fight. Durán had won the WBC middleweight title after upsetting Iran Barkley in his previous fight, though only Leonard's super middleweight was on the line. Leonard and Durán agreed to a catch-weight of 162 pounds, between the middleweight limit of 160 pounds and the super middleweight limit of 168 pounds. Initial plans called for both Leonard and Duran's titles to be at stake, but Duran's mandatory challenger Lindell Holmes refused to step aside and insisted on Duran making his next defense against him, resulting in Durán's title not being defended. 

The fight was billed as "Uno Mas" (one more in Spanish) in reference to Leonard and Duran's second fight against each other in which Duran quit in round eight after apparently telling the referee "No Mas" (no more in Spanish).

The fight
In contrast to their first two fights, this was entirely lopsided in Leonard's favor. Using constant movement and counter-punching, Leonard dominated Duran, completely neutralizing Duran's offensive attack. Leonard landed 227 punches, good for 52% of his total thrown punches compared to Duran, who landed a dismal 84 punches at a 14% rate. The fight went the full 12-round distance, with all three judges scoring the fight for Leonard with scores of 120–110, 119–109 and 116–111.

Fight card

See also 
 Sugar Ray Leonard vs. Roberto Durán
 Roberto Durán vs. Sugar Ray Leonard II

References

1989 in boxing
Boxing in Las Vegas
Boxing on HBO
Duran III
December 1989 sports events in the United States
Nicknamed sporting events